Michel Jacques François Achard (14 October 1778 – 6 January 1865) was a French general de brigade (brigadier general).

He was a member of the Chamber of Peers under the July Monarchy, a member of the National Legislative Assembly of the French Second Republic and a member of the Senate of the Second French Empire.

Honours 
 Grand Cross of the Legion of Honour
 knight of the Order of Saint Louis
 1833: Commander of the Order of Leopold.

References

Books
 
 

1778 births
1865 deaths
Grand Croix of the Légion d'honneur
Knights of the Order of Saint Louis
Members of the Chamber of Peers of the July Monarchy
French Senators of the Second Empire
Members of the National Legislative Assembly of the French Second Republic
Place of birth missing